The 2014 Donegal Senior Football Championship was contested by senior Gaelic football clubs under the auspices of Donegal GAA. The defending champions were Glenswilly. They were dethroned in the 2014 final.

Format
It was announced in 2013 that the 2014 County Championship would begin as soon as the Donegal senior football team were eliminated from the Sam Maguire Cup, which, as it transpired, was in September after the 2014 All-Ireland Senior Football Championship Final. The deferral was decided upon in September 2013 when twenty clubs voted in favour, while six did not (one club was not in attendance). The controversy over this decision became a "national media story" and irked inter-county manager Jim McGuinness.

The format remained the same as the previous year, when a group stage was introduced. 28 September Round 1 senior championship, 5 October Round 2 senior championship, 12 October Round 3 senior championship, 19 October Senior championship quarter-final, 26 October Senior championship semi-final, 2 November Senior championship final.

Group stage

Group 1

Round 1
 Naomh Muire 0-10, 0-12 Naomh Conaill, The Banks, 27/9/2014,
 Malin 2-6, 1-17 St Eunan's, Connolly Park, 28/9/2014,

Round 2
 Naomh Conaill 0-10, 0-7 Malin, Glenties, 4/10/2014,
 St Eunan's 1-21, 1-5 Naomh Muire, O'Donnell Park, 5/10/2014,

Round 3
 Naomh Muire 1-9, 6-10 Malin, Connolly Park, 12/10/2014,
 Naomh Conaill 0-9, 0-7 St Eunan's, Glenties, 12/10/2014,

Group 2

Round 1
 Glenfin 0-8, 0-13 Seán MacCumhaills, Glenfin, 27/9/2014
 Four Masters 0-9, 0-9 Ardara, Pairc Tir Conaill, 28/9/2014

Round 2
 Seán MacCumhaills 0-9, 2-14 Four Masters, MacCumhaill Park, 4/10/2014
 Ardara 0-13, 1-9 Glenfin, Ardara, 5/10/2014

Round 3
 Seán MacCumhaills 0-13, 2-7 Ardara, MacCumhaill Park, 11/10/2014
 Glenfin 0-7, 2-13 Four Masters, Glenfin, 11/10/2014

Group 3

Round 1
 Killybegs 1-6, 1-6 Gaoth Dobhair, Killybegs, 27/9/2014
 An Clochán Liath 0-11, 0-8 Termon, An Clochán Liath, 28/9/2014

Round 2
 Gaoth Dobhair 1-8, 0-8 An Clochán Liath, Gweedore, 5/10/2014
 Termon 0-8, 1-5 Killybegs, Termon, 5/10/2014

Round 3
 Termon 0-14, 1-9 Gaoth Dobhair, Termon, 12/10/2014
 An Clochán Liath 0-9, 0-7 Killybegs, An Clochán Liath, 12/10/2014

Group 4

Round 1
 St Michael's 4-10, 0-6 Réalt na Mara, Dunfanaghy, 27/9/2014
 Glenswilly 0-6, 0-9 Kilcar, Glenswilly, 28/9/2014

Round 2
 Réalt na Mara 0-9, 6-15 Glenswilly, Bundoran, 4/10/2014
 Kilcar 0-5, 2-8 St Michael's, 5/10/2014

Round 3
 Kilcar 5-15, 0-3 Réalt na Mara, Kilcar, 11/10/2014
 Glenswilly 1-4, 1-2 St Michael's, Glenswilly, 11/10/2014

Knockout stage

Relegation playoff

Relegation Semi-final
 Killybegs w, l Réalt na Mara, Tir Conaill Park, 19/10/2015,
 Naomh Mhuire w, l Glenfin, Glenswilly, 19/10/2015,

Relegation final
 Glenfin w, l Réalt na Mara

Relegation final

Finals

Quarter-finals
 Four Masters 0-7, 2-10 St Eunan's, MacCumhaill Park, 18/10/2014
 An Clochán Liath 0-10, 1-13 St Michael's, MacCumhaill Park, 19/10/2014
 Glenswilly 3-9, 0-4 Termon, O'Donnell Park, 19/10/2014,
 Naomh Conaill 0-12, 1-9 Ardara, Tir Conaill Park, 19/10/2014

Quarter-final Replay
 Naomh Conaill 0-9, 1-5 Ardara, MacCumhaill Park, 22/10/2014

Semi-finals
 St Eunan's 1-12, 2-8 St Michael's, MacCumhaill Park, 26/10/2014
 Naomh Conaill 0-8, 0-10 Glenswilly, O'Donnell Park, 26/10/2014

Final
 St Eunan's 0-9, 0-6 Glenswilly, MacCumhaill Park, 2/11/2014

Final
Ahead of the final Glenswilly player and Donegal captain Michael Murphy was named Ireland captain for the 2014 International Rules Test, the second consecutive year this had happened.

Naomh Conaill lost a last ditch appeal to contest the final. Their grievance came from a black-card incident in their semi-final, involving Glenswilly's Ciaran Bonner. Glenswilly led the Glenties-based team by one point with two minutes of normal time remaining, when Bonner got the black card and was replaced by substitute Oisín Crawford. Bonner, Naomh Conaill maintained, was not eligible to be replaced as he had already picked up a yellow card.

Glenswilly lost.

References

Donegal Senior Football Championship
Donegal Senior Football Championship